"Stigmata" is a song by American industrial metal band Ministry. Written by frontman Al Jourgensen, it is the opening track and the only single released from their third studio album, 1988’s The Land of Rape and Honey. The song features distorted vocals, guitars and compressed drum machine loops. The song was an underground hit. The music video—which was said to get a regular airing on MTV—features gritty black and white machinery, gears, symbols, the band playing live, Paul Barker on a motorcycle, strobe-like montages of eyes (which are the only elements presented in color), and what appear to be neo-Nazi skinheads. The song was said to be Ministry's "finest moment until 1992".

The track was later featured in the 1990 science fiction horror movie Hardware and the 1995 Hong Kong action comedy film Rumble in the Bronx. The 2017 action movie  Atomic Blonde (taking place in 1989) features a cover of the song by Marilyn Manson. The 12-inch single remix of the song was featured in the 2006 video game, Tony Hawk's Project 8. The song was also featured as an unlockable track in the 2009 video game Brütal Legend. In August 2010, the song became available for download in the Rock Band series of games.

In his 2013 autobiography, Ministry: The Lost Gospels..., Jourgensen writes that although "Stigmata" is one of Ministry's most popular songs, he hates it for being "too simplistic" and for its use of sampled rather than actual guitars. He wrote "Stigmata" at the last minute after realising he needed another song to complete the album.

Track listing

Personnel

Ministry
Alain Jourgensen - vocals ("Stigmata"), guitar, programming, production, engineer
Paul Barker - bass, programming, production, engineer

Additional personnel
William Rieflin - drums ("Tonight We Murder"), programming
Frank Nardiello - vocals ("Tonight We Murder"), cover painting
Brian Shanley - cover design

References

1988 singles
Ministry (band) songs
Sire Records singles
1988 songs
Warner Records singles
Songs written by Al Jourgensen
Marilyn Manson (band) songs
Song recordings produced by Al Jourgensen